State Road 678 (SR 678) is a  stretch of Bearss Avenue between (Business US 41 (U.S. Route 41 Bus.) and SR 685 (Florida Avenue) and US 41/SR 45 (Nebraska Avenue) in Tampa, Florida. Similar to SR 579 to the south, it connects those two north–south roads with Interstate 275 (I-275 or SR 93), halfway between them. SR 678 is signed east–west.

Route description
SR 678 serves as a connector between US 41 Business and US 41. State Road 678 has its western terminus at an interchange with US 41 Business. At this point, Bearss Avenue, designated as County Road 678, becomes State Road 678. Immediately the roadway widens to 6 lanes as it begins its eastern route. The state road along its entire stretch goes through a commercial district with numerous strip malls. After .3 miles from its western terminus, State Road 678 has an interchange with Interstate 275, providing access to both the interstate's northbound and southbound lanes. After the interchange, the number of lanes on the road thins down to 4. State Road 678 continues through the shopping district before each its eastern terminus with US 41 after .2 miles. At its eastern terminus, East Bearss Avenue loses its state road signage and returns to being County Road 678.

Major intersections

References

External links

678
678
678
State highways in the United States shorter than one mile